Eric Arnold Mahlum (born December 6, 1970) is a former offensive guard in the National Football League (NFL). He played his entire career for the Indianapolis Colts from 1994 to 1997. Mahlum has been the Football coach at Liberty High School in Hillsboro Oregon since 2005. Since then he has had a 85-54 record.

1970 births
Living people
Players of American football from San Diego
American football offensive guards
California Golden Bears football players
Indianapolis Colts players